During the 1961–62 English football season, Arsenal F.C. competed in the Football League First Division.

Final league table

Results
Arsenal's score comes first

Legend

Football League First Division

FA Cup

Squad

References

Arsenal F.C. seasons
Arsenal